The 2015 Rice Owls football team represented Rice University in the 2015 NCAA Division I FBS football season as members of the West Division of Conference USA. They were led by ninth year head coach David Bailiff and played their home games at Rice Stadium in Houston, Texas. They finished the season 5–7, 3–5 in C-USA play to finish in a three-way tie for third place in the West Division.

Schedule
Rice announced their 2015 football schedule on February 2, 2015. The 2015 schedule consisted of six home and away games in the regular season. The Owls hosted CUSA foes Charlotte, Louisiana Tech, Southern Miss, and Western Kentucky (WKU), and traveled to Florida Atlantic, North Texas, UTEP, and UTSA.

Schedule source:

Game summaries

Wagner

at Texas

at North Texas

at Baylor

WKU

at Florida Atlantic

Army

Louisiana Tech

at UTEP

Southern Miss

at UTSA

Charlotte

References

Rice
Rice Owls football seasons
Rice Owls football